Ján Tánczos (born 23 November 1954) is a Czechoslovak former ski jumper.

References

Living people
1954 births
Slovak male ski jumpers
Czechoslovak male ski jumpers
Place of birth missing (living people)